Chlorogomphus campioni, Nilgiri mountain hawk, is a species of dragonfly in the family Chlorogomphidae. It is known only from the Western Ghats of India. The distribution of the species is restricted to South Canara and Kodagu in Karnataka, Malabar in Kerala  and the Nilgris in Tamil Nadu.

Description and habitat
It is a large dragonfly with its head rather broad from side to side and eyes are moderately separated with emerald green colour. Its thorax is black with three oblique bright yellow stripes. Its wings are transparent with dark brown apices and black pterostigma. Abdomen is black with yellow markings. The colour and markings of the female is very similar to the male.

It is commonly found in mountains in the Western Ghats, soaring in high altitudes. 

The species is named after Herbert Campion.

See also
 List of odonates of India
 List of odonata of Kerala

References

Chlorogomphidae
Taxa named by Frederic Charles Fraser